Cerithiopsidella ziliolii is a species of  very small sea snails, marine gastropod molluscs in the family Cerithiopsidae. It was described by Cecalupo and Perugia in 2012.

Distribution
This marine species occurs off Papua New Guinea.

References

New species of Cerithiopsidae (Gastropoda: Triphoroidea) from Papua New Guinea (Pacific Ocean). Visaya Suppl. 11: 1-187

External links
 Holotype in MNHN, Paris

Cerithiopsidae
Gastropods described in 2012